Louis Pinat ( 12 August 1929 - 30 December 2015) was a French footballer who played as goalkeeper.

Career statistics

Club

Notes

References

1929 births
2015 deaths
French footballers
French football managers
Association football goalkeepers
Ligue 1 players
Ligue 2 players
Stade Rennais F.C. players
FC Nantes players
CS Hammam-Lif managers
French expatriate sportspeople in Tunisia
People from Boulogne-sur-Mer
Sportspeople from Pas-de-Calais
Footballers from Hauts-de-France
French expatriate football managers
Expatriate football managers in Tunisia
France B international footballers